Grays Lake is a  kettle lake located in the Village of Grayslake in Lake County, Illinois.

Local regulations
Motorized watercraft are generally not allowed on the lake. Largemouth bass must be 15 inches long or longer to keep while northern pike must be 24 inches long or longer to keep. 2 line limit

Statistics

Watershed
Grays Lake lies at the top of and drains into the Mill Creek, watershed. The Mill Creek watershed lies in the Des Plaines River watershed, which lies in the Illinois River watershed, which lies in the Mississippi River watershed, which drains into the Gulf of Mexico and eventually into the Atlantic Ocean.

Fauna
Fish
Largemouth bass, crappie, northern pike, yellow perch, sunfish, carp and catfish.

Mammals
Fox, coyote, gray squirrel, chipmunk, raccoon, bat

Amphibians
Frog

Birds
Turkey vulture, American robin, American goldfinch, blue heron, mallard duck, swan, dark-eyed junco, red-tailed hawk

Reptiles
Common snapping turtle

Flora

Pickerel rush

Jones Island 

At the west end of the lake is a peninsula called Jones Island. This area, previously a marsh, was filled in to improve recreational opportunities.

References

External links
 Grays Lake Information Website
 Lake County Lakes Management Information
 Lake County Illinois Mapping

Lakes of Lake County, Illinois
Grayslake, Illinois
Lakes of Illinois
Kettle lakes in the United States